Busting Loose is an American sitcom starring Adam Arkin which centers on a young man in New York City who has moved out of his parents house to live on his own for the first time. The show aired on CBS between January 17, 1977, and November 16, 1977.

Cast and characters
 Adam Arkin as Lenny Markowitz
 Barbara Rhoades as Melody Feebeck
 Jack Kruschen as Sam Markowitz
 Pat Carroll as Pearl Markowitz
 Danny Goldman as Lester Bellman
 Steve Nathan as Allan Simmonds
 Greg Antonacci as Vinnie Mordabito
 Paul Sylvan as Woody Warshaw
 Paul B. Price as Ralph Cabell
 Ralph Wilcox as Raymond St. Williams
 Louise Williams as Jackie Gleason

Synopsis

Lenny Markowitz is a 24-year-old Jewish American man who recently graduated from engineering school. Tired of living with his overprotective and meddling parents Sam and Pearl, he secretly moves out on his own for the first time – "busting loose" from them – into a low-rent apartment in a rundown apartment building in New York City where his neighbor is Melody Feebeck, a beautiful, voluptuous, older redheaded woman who works for an escort service. Lacking the money even to replace the duck-covered wallpaper in his new apartment and still looking for work as an engineer, he temporarily takes a menial job at the Wearwell Shoe Store, operated by Ralph Cabell, where his coworker is Raymond St. Williams, a "hip" young African American man. His childhood friends Lester Bellman, Allan Simmonds, Vinnie Mordabito, and Woody Warshaw frequently visit him; they play poker together and get involved in various escapades. In the fall of 1977, Lenny finds a regular girlfriend, Jackie Gleason, an attractive young woman unrelated – and bearing no resemblance – to the real-life television star Jackie Gleason.

Production notes

Mark Rothman and Lowell Ganz created Busting Loose and served as its executive producers, and Rothman composed the shows theme music. Lawrence Kasha was the producer for the first season; John Thomas Lenox produced the second season. Lenox also directed one episode; the other episode directors were Greg Antonacci, James Burrows, Mel Ferber, Norm Gray, Asaad Kelada, Harvey Miller, Tony Mordente, Alan Myerson, Bill Persky, Howard Storm, and Joel Zwick. Antonacci, Ganz, Rothman, Chet Dowling, David W. Duclon, Howard Gewirtz, Joe Glauberg, Sandy Krinski, David Lerner, Deborah Leschin, Babaloo Mandel, and Barry Rubinowitz all wrote or co-wrote one or more episodes.

During its first season, Busting Loose aired on CBS on Monday at 8:30 p.m. from January to May 1977. The show then left the air until July 1977, when reruns of the first season began to air on Wednesday at 8:30 p.m. The second season also ran at 8:30 p.m. on Wednesday in the fall of 1977.

In "Mr. Dennis Steps Out," broadcast on October 26, 1977, as the fifth episode of the second season of Busting Loose, Melody is afraid that her boss at the escort service, Roger Dennis – played by guest star Ted Knight – is going to fire her. The episode served as the pilot for Knights first show of his own, the short-lived 1978 sitcom The Ted Knight Show, which centered on Roger Denniss firm, the Mr. Dennis Escort Service. However, Barbara Rhoades and her Melody Feebeck character did not appear in The Ted Knight Show.

Episodes

Busting Loose was broadcast over two seasons. Thirteen episodes aired during its first season in the winter and spring of 1977. Eight more were broadcast during its second season in the fall of 1977, and four other episodes produced for that season never aired.

Season 1 (1977)

Season 2 (1977)

Sources

Notes

External links
Busting Loose opening credits on YouTube
1977 CBS promotional advertisement for Good Times and Busting Loose

CBS original programming
1977 American television series debuts
1977 American television series endings
1970s American sitcoms
English-language television shows
Television shows set in New York City
Television series by CBS Studios